Strombus alatus, the Florida fighting conch, is a species of medium-sized, warm-water sea snail, a marine gastropod mollusk in the family Strombidae, the true conchs.

Distribution 
This conch occurs in the Western Atlantic Ocean from North Carolina to Florida and the Gulf of Mexico, Louisiana, Texas, and the east coast of Mexico.

Description

This species is closely similar to Strombus pugilis, the West Indian fighting conch, which has a more southerly range.  S. alatus shells have less prominent subsutural spines and slightly more projected outer lips.  Some scientists have treated the two as distinct species; others as subspecies.   In an extensive study of the Stromboidea in 2005, Simone provisionally treated these as distinct species, but observed, "no spectacular morphological difference was found [and] all related differences, even those of the genital system, can be regarded as extreme of variation of a single, wide distributed, variable species."

Phylogeny

A cladogram based on sequences of nuclear histone H3 gene and mitochondrial cytochrome-c oxidase I (COI) gene showing phylogenetic relationships of (32 analyzed) species in the genus Strombus and Lambis, including S. alatus, was proposed by Latiolais et al. (2006):

Habitat 
The minimum recorded depth for this species is the surface; the maximum recorded depth is 183 m.

References

Strombidae
Gastropods described in 1791
Taxa named by Johann Friedrich Gmelin